Juana Martinez-Neal is a Peruvian American children's book author and illustrator. Her debut book as an author and illustrator, Alma and How She Got Her Name, was well reviewed and won a 2019 Caldecott Award Honor.

Biography 
Juana Martinez-Neal grew up in Lima, Peru. Growing up she hoped to be a painter, like her father and grandfather, as the profession of illustrator was not common in Peru. She moved to the United States in her mid-20s. After having children of her own she decided to become an author and illustrator of children's books. She now lives in Connecticut, with her husband and three children.

Bibliography 
As Writer and Illustrator
Alma and How She Got Her Name, Candlewick Press, 2018 
Alma y cómo obtuvo su nombre, Candlewick Press, 2018 
Zonia's Rainforest, Candlewick Press, 2021  
La selva de Zonia, Candlewick Press, 2021  

As Illustrator

La Madre Goose, written by Susan Middleton Elya, Putnam, 2016 
La Princesa and the Pea, written by Susan Middleton Elya, Putnam, 2017 
Babymoon, written by Hayley Barrett, Candlewick Press, 2019 
Fry Bread, written by Kevin Noble Maillard, Roaring Brook Press, 2019 
Swashby and the Sea, written by Beth Ferry, Houghton Mifflin Harcourt, 2020  
Tomatoes for Neela, written by Padma Lakshmi, Viking Children's Books, 2021  
A Perfect Fit, written by Mara Rockliff, Houghton Mifflin Harcourt, 2022  
 I Don't Care, written by Julie Fogliano, illustrated by Molly Idle and Juana Martinez-Neal, Neal Porter Books-Holiday House, 2022 (Forthcoming)

Awards and honors 

 2018 Pura Belpré Illustrator Winner – La Princesa and the Pea
2019 Caldecott Honor – Alma and How She Got Her Name
 2019 Ezra Jack Keats Award Writer Honor – Alma and How She Got Her Name”
2020 Sibert Medal – Fry Bread: A Native American Family Story

References

External links 

Hispanic and Latino American women in the arts
Year of birth missing (living people)
Living people
Peruvian women artists
American women illustrators
American illustrators
21st-century American women artists
Caldecott Medal winners
American women children's writers
American children's writers
21st-century American women writers
21st-century Peruvian women writers
People from Lima
Peruvian emigrants to the United States
Hispanic and Latino American artists
Robert F. Sibert Informational Book Medal winners